Joshipura is a surname of people who come from in an around the town of Vadnagar. There are Joshipura families which have roots in Porbandar and Bombay (Mumbai) as well. They belong to "Nagar" community which is one of the most learned community of Gujarat, a western state of India.

People 

 , Indian scientist
 Kaumudi Joshipura, Indian dentist-scientist, biostatistician, and epidemiologist

Surnames